The Asian Case Research Journal provides a compilation of original cases on Asian companies and MNCs operating in Asia-Pacific. The journal was founded in 1997. Cases in the journal are decisional or illustrative, covering a wide range of business disciplines, from Marketing to Management Information Systems.

Abstracting and indexing
The journal is abstracted and indexed in:
 CSA Risk Abstracts
 Social Sciences Citation Index
 Social Scisearch
 Journal Citation Reports/Social Sciences Edition

References

External links
 ACRJ Journal Website

Publications established in 1997
Business and management journals
English-language journals
World Scientific academic journals